The St. John's metropolitan area is the most populous census metropolitan area (CMA) in the Canadian province of Newfoundland and Labrador. With a population of 212,579 in the 2021 Canadian Census, the CMA is the second largest in Atlantic Canada and the 22nd largest CMA in Canada.

The St. John’s CMA has an estimated population of 212,579 as of 2021. The CMA comprises the City of St. John's and twelve other communities, the largest of which are the town of Conception Bay South and the city of Mount Pearl.

Demographics
''The following information is from: Statistics Canada

Population change

St. John's metropolitan area

Municipalities

Population density

References

Metropolitan areas of Newfoundland and Labrador
Geography of St. John's, Newfoundland and Labrador